Issiaga Soumah (born 14 May 1974 in Conakry) is a Guinean football (soccer) midfielder. He currently plays for Tours FC. He holds a French passport.

External links

1974 births
Living people
Sportspeople from Conakry
Guinean footballers
French sportspeople of Guinean descent
Association football midfielders
Angoulême Charente FC players
Tours FC players
FC 105 Libreville players
CS Hammam-Lif players
Expatriate footballers in Gabon
Expatriate footballers in Tunisia
Guinean expatriate sportspeople in Tunisia
AS Kaloum Star players
Guinea international footballers
Black French sportspeople